Horatio Ernest Hall (25 April 1861 – 1 December 1919) played cricket for Somerset from 1881 to 1885; the final three matches he played for the team were first-class games. He was born at Clifton, Bristol, Bristol and died at Axbridge, Somerset.

in his first-class matches for Somerset, Hall was usually a lower-order batsman and a bowler, though his batting and bowling styles are not known. In his final match for the county, the game against Hampshire in 1885, he finished not out at the end of the first innings and was then promoted to open the batting in the second innings, scoring 23, his highest first-class score. This was the game in which Somerset played with only nine men in their side, and at the end of that season they lost their first-class status, and Hall played for them no more.

Notes

References

Bibliography
 

1861 births
1919 deaths
English cricketers
Somerset cricketers
Cricketers from Bristol